Pilbur (also Romanized as Pīlbūr; also known as Pīleh Bar and Pīleh Par) is a village in Deylaman Rural District, Deylaman District, Siahkal County, Gilan Province, Iran. At the 2006 census, its population was 18, in 8 families.

References 

Populated places in Siahkal County